This is a list of Stephen F. Austin Lumberjacks football players in the NFL Draft.

Key

Selections

References

Stephen F. Austin

Stephen F. Austin Lumberjacks NFL Draft